Charles Van Damme (born May 1946) is a Belgian cinematographer and film director. He has worked on 40 films since 1973. His film The Violin Player was entered into the 1994 Cannes Film Festival.

Selected filmography
 One Sings, the Other Doesn't (1977)
 Descente aux enfers (1986)
 A Strange Place to Meet (1988)
 The Violin Player (1994 - directed)
 Une Fenêtre ouverte (2005)
 The Demon Stirs (2005)

References

External links

1946 births
Living people
Belgian cinematographers
Belgian film directors